The Furies is a 2016 family comedy-drama film with tragedy elements written and directed by Miguel del Arco. The ensemble cast features Pere Arquillué, Gonzalo de Castro, Elisabet Gelabert, Bárbara Lennie, Carmen Machi, José Sacristán, Mercedes Sampietro, Alberto San Juan, Macarena Sanz and  Emma Suárez.

Plot 
Marga, the matriarch of the Ponte Alegre family, is set to sell the family's summer house, so she encourages their three children to go there to choose as many items as they wish to preserve.

Cast

Production 
The film,  debut feature, is an Aquí y Allí Films and Kamikaze Producciones production, with participation of TVE and Movistar+. It had a €1.5 million budget. Filming began on 10 August 2015. Shooting locations included the seaside town of Suances, Cantabria.

Release 
The Furies was presented at the 61st Valladolid International Film Festival (Seminci) on 23 October 2016, screened as the festival's opening film. Distributed by Wanda Vision, the film was theatrically released in Spain on 11 November 2016.

Reception 
Jordi Costa of Fotogramas, rated the film 4 out of 5 stars, considering that "the presentation of characters and conflicts is absolutely exemplary", likewise citing the harmony between director and cast as a positive point, while warning that someone viewers "will get indigestion from the final excesses".

Sergio F. Pinilla of Cinemanía rated it 3½ out of 5 stars, writing that the film, dialogue-wise, "is too intense", featuring a not quite fitting climax, standing out for "its narrative and stylistic eloquence". He found a likeness with films by Sam Mendes, P.T. Anderson and Woody Allen.

Quim Casas of El Periódico de Catalunya scored 2 out of 5 stars, considering that some of the characters "are more interesting in theory than in practice", wondering if perhaps there was no need for such stridency, concluding that "excess eventually devours intensity".

Accolades 

|-
| align = "center" rowspan = "2" | 2017 || 72nd CEC Medals || Best New Actress || Macarena Sanz ||  || 
|-
| 26th Actors and Actresses Union Awards || Best Film Actress in a Minor Role || Emma Suárez ||  || 
|}

See also 
 List of Spanish films of 2016

References 

Aquí y Allí Films films
Films shot in Cantabria
2010s Spanish-language films
Spanish comedy-drama films
2010 comedy-drama films
2010s Spanish films